Wesson is a ghost town in Comal County, Texas, USA.

History
The original name was Henderson Crossing, after Hensley G. Henderson, an early settler. The name was changed to Esser Crossing after Charles Esser. The official name of Wesson was chosen in the 1890s.

References

Geography of Comal County, Texas
Ghost towns in Texas